The 2018 Pakistan Super League Final was a Twenty20 cricket match, played on 25 March 2018 at the National Stadium in Karachi, Pakistan to determine the winner of the 2018 Pakistan Super League. The inaugural champions Islamabad United defeated the defending champions Peshawar Zalmi by 3 wickets to win their second title. Luke Ronchi was awarded player of the match and player of the tournament awards. The tickets for final were sold out within 3 hours.

Route to the Final
During the group stage of the 2018 Pakistan Super League each team played ten matches, two against each of the other sides contesting the competition. All matches were played in the United Arab Emirates due to the security situation in Pakistan. The top four teams progressed to the playoff stage. Islamabad United finished the group stage with first position by winning seven of their matches and losing three. Peshawar Zalmi finished the group stage with third position by winning five of their matches and losing five.

League stage matches

Playoff matches

Match
The final took place on 25 March 2018 at National Stadium in Karachi, Pakistan. This was also the first PSL match taking place in Karachi and a high-profile tournament final match taking place there after almost a decade.

Report
Peshawar Zalmi won the toss and elected to bat first. Peshawar's in-form batsman Kamran Akmal was out lbw for 1 run off 8 balls, with Samit Patel taking the wicket in the third over early on. The fourth-wicket fifty-partnership between Chris Jordan and Liam Dawson; and Wahab Riaz's 28 runs off 14 balls ensured their side reached to a total of 148 runs in the innings in which Islamabad's Shadab Khan took three wickets. 

Islamabad batting second had Luke Ronchi hit five sixes in the first five overs as he raced to 45 runs off just 15 balls, before he got out in the ninth over after scoring a 26-ball 52. By the time, Ronchi and Sahibzada Farhan - who played his own part with 44 runs off 33 balls - had put on 96 runs for the opening partnership in under nine overs. But a sudden collapse resulted in Islamabad losing six wickets for 20 runs leaving them at 116/6. Akmal then dropped a catch at fine leg when Asif Ali attempted a pull shot off Umaid Asif with Islamabad needing 30 runs off 33 balls. Asif Ali then hit three sixes on the trot off Hasan Ali. While the winning runs were scored by Faheem Ashraf who hooked Wahab Riaz for six with just one run required.

Scorecard
Keys
 indicates team captain
 * indicates not out

Toss: Peshawar Zalmi won the toss and elected to bat.

|colspan="4"|Extras (lb 3, w 2)Total 148/9 (20 overs)
|12
|6
|7.40 RR

Fall of wickets: 12/1 (K Akmal, 2.4 ov), 24/2 (Hafeez, 4.1 ov), 38/3 (Fletcher, 5.6 ov), 90/4 (Jordan, 12.3 ov), 101/5 (Saad Nasim, 14.1 ov), 111/6 (Sammy, 15.4 ov), 111/7 (Umaid, 15.5), 117/8 (LA Dawson, 16.4 ov), 121/9 (Hasan Ali, 17.5 ov)

Target: 149 runs from 20 overs at 7.45 RR

|colspan="4"|Extras (lb 1, w 5)Total 154/7 (16.5 overs)
|11
|10
|9.14 RR

Fall of wickets: 96/1 (L Ronchi, 8.5 ov), 97/2 (Walton, 9.1 ov), 102/3 (JP Duminy, 10.3 ov), 112/4 (Farhan, 11.6 ov), 115/5 (SP Patel, 13.1 ov), 116/6 (Shadab, 13.6 ov), 148/7 (Hussain, 16.1 ov)

Result: Islamabad United won by 3 wickets.

Match Officials

References

 

 
Super League Final
2018 in Sindh 
Final
2010s in Karachi
Cricket in Karachi
March 2018 sports events in Pakistan
2018